The 1974 Kansas City Chiefs season was the franchise's fifth season in the National Football League, the twelfth season in Kansas City Chiefs, and the fifteenth overall,  it ended with a  5–9 record and the Chiefs missed the playoffs for the third straight season consecutive and third-place finish in the AFC West, Hank Stram was fired after the season and was replaced by Paul Wiggin in 1975.

While the club's new facility at Arrowhead Stadium was drawing rave reviews, the Chiefs roster was beginning to show its age.  The result was the team's first losing season in eleven years as the club was unable to string together consecutive victories during the year, a first in franchise history. Many of the club's key players were entering the twilight of their careers: Len Dawson was 39, Jim Tyrer was 35, Bobby Bell, Buck Buchanan, and Ed Budde were 34, Dave Hill was 33 and Otis Taylor was 32.

One of the year's few bright spots in the 5–9 season was cornerback Emmitt Thomas, who led the league with a franchise-record 12 interceptions. The final game of the 1974 campaign marked the final time all seven of Kansas City's Pro Football Hall of Fame players from the club's AFL champion era took the field together with coach Hank Stram. Including owner Lamar Hunt and seven future Minnesota Vikings Hall of Famers, an amazing total of 16 Hall of Fame inductees were involved in that 1974 season finale game. That 35–15 loss against Minnesota provided an anticlimactic conclusion to Hank Stram's illustrious coaching career in Kansas City. Three days later, Stram, the only head coach in franchise history was relieved of his duties on December 27 after compiling a 124–76–10 regular season record with the club.

Offseason

NFL Draft

Roster

Schedule

Preseason

Regular season

Standings

Game summaries

Week 1 vs. New York Jets

Week 2 at Oakland Raiders

Week 3 at Houston Oilers

Week 4 vs. Denver Broncos

Week 5 vs Pittsburgh Steelers

Week 6 at Miami Dolphins

Week 7 at San Diego Chargers

Week 8 vs. New York Giants

Week 9 vs San Diego Chargers

Week 10 at Denver Broncos

Week 11 at Cincinnati Bengals

Week 12 at St. Louis Cardinals

Week 13 vs. Oakland Raiders

Week 14 vs Minnesota Vikings

References

Kansas City Chiefs
Kansas City Chiefs seasons
Kansas